Surtainville is a commune in the Manche department in Normandy in north-western France. It is located on the west coast of the Cotentin Peninsula about 25 km south of Cherbourg.  The principal economic activity is horticulture, with an emphasis on salad crops; tourism, especially camping, is a subsidiary activity.

See also
Communes of the Manche department

References

Communes of Manche